The Chinese Taipei women's national 3x3 team is a national basketball team of Chinese Taipei, administered by the Chinese Taipei Basketball Association.
It represents the country in international 3x3 (3 against 3) women's basketball competitions.

See also
Chinese Taipei men's national 3x3 team
Chinese Taipei women's national basketball team

References

3x3
Women's national 3x3 basketball teams